The following lists events that happened during 1937 in New Zealand.

Population
 Estimated population as of 31 December: 1,601,800
 Increase since 31 December 1936: 17,200 (1.09%)
 Males per 100 females: 103.1

Incumbents

Regal and viceregal 
Head of State – George VI
Governor-General – The Viscount Galway GCMG DSO OBE PC

Government 

The 25th New Zealand Parliament continued with the Labour Party in government.

 Speaker of the House – Bill Barnard (Labour Party)
 Prime Minister – Michael Joseph Savage
 Minister of Finance – Walter Nash
 Minister of Foreign Affairs – Michael Joseph Savage
 Attorney-General – Rex Mason
 Chief Justice – Sir Michael Myers

Parliamentary opposition 
 Leader of the Opposition –  Adam Hamilton (National Party).

Main centre leaders 
 Mayor of Auckland – Ernest Davis
 Mayor of Wellington – Thomas Hislop
 Mayor of Christchurch – John Beanland
 Mayor of Dunedin – Edwin Thomas Cox

Events 
 16 January – The Hawke's Bay Herald publishes its final issue before merging with the Hawke's Bay Tribune to form the Hawke's Bay Herald-Tribune (now part of Hawke's Bay Today). It started as the Hawke's Bay Herald and Ahuriri Advocate in 1857.
 1 February – The 1937 New Year Honours are announced.
 11 May – The King George VI Coronation Honours are announced.
 Milk in schools (a half pint daily for each primary school pupil) starts, and continues until 1967.

Arts and literature 

See 1937 in art, 1937 in literature

Music 

See: 1937 in music

Broadcasting 

 6 May – Historic radio link up to cover the arrival of Airship Hindenburg at New Jersey (and hence its destruction by fire). This is probably the first direct international radio broadcast of this nature from such a distance.

See: Public broadcasting in New Zealand

Film 

 New Zealand Review no.1, Holiday Sounds 

See: :Category:1937 film awards, 1937 in film, List of New Zealand feature films, Cinema of New Zealand, :Category:1937 films

Sport

Chess
 The 46th National Chess Championship was held in Auckland, and was won by H.R. Abbott of Christchurch.

Golf
 The 27th New Zealand Open championship was won by J.P. Hornabrook, an amateur, in a three-way playoff with A.J. Shaw and Ernie Moss.
 The 41st National Amateur Championships were held in Hamilton
 Men: B.M. Silk (Wanganui) – his second title
 Women: Mrs G.W. Hollis

Horse racing

Harness racing
 New Zealand Trotting Cup – Lucky Jack
 Auckland Trotting Cup – Willow Wave

Lawn bowls
The national outdoor lawn bowls championships are held in Wellington.
 Men's singles champion – C. Spearman (Sydenham Bowling Club)
 Men's pair champions – D. Hunter, J.W. Lowry (skip) (Petone Bowling Club)
 Men's fours champions – C.H. Elsom, P. Munn, C.J. Shaw, R. Haworth (skip) (Canterbury Bowling Club)

Rugby 
:Category:Rugby union in New Zealand, :Category:All Blacks
 Ranfurly Shield

Rugby league 
New Zealand national rugby league team

Soccer 
 Chatham Cup competition not held this year.
 An England Amateurs team toured, beating the New Zealand side by a resounding 30–1 aggregate in a three-match series.
 5 May, Dunedin: NZ 0–12 England Amateurs
 19 May, Auckland: NZ 0–6 England Amateurs
 26 May, Wellington: NZ 1–12 England Amateur
 Provincial league champions:
	Auckland:	Thistle
	Canterbury:	Technical OB, Western (shared)
	Hawke's Bay:	Napier Utd
	Nelson:	YMCA
	Otago:	Mosgiel
	Southland:	Boy's Brigade OB
	Waikato:	Hamilton Wanderers
	Wanganui:	Wanganui Athletic
	Wellington:	Waterside

Births

January
 1 January  – Lance Pearson, cricketer, basketball player, coach and administrator
 3 January – Archie Taiaroa, Māori leader
 10 January – Ralph Caulton, rugby union player, coach and administrator
 13 January – Guy Dodson, biochemist
 14 January – Ann Chapman, limnologist
 15 January – Ray Henwood, actor
 16 January – Ahmed Said Musa Patel, Muslim cleric
 21 January – Colin Barclay, cricketer
 26 January
 Murray Ball, cartoonist
 Bruce McPhail, rugby union player
 31 January – David Tarrant, cricketer

February
 2 February
 Tony Shelly, motor racing driver
 Neale Thompson, cricketer, badminton player
 19 February – Warwick Dalton, racing cyclist
 23 February – David Kinsella, cricket player and umpire

March
 4 March – Graham Dowling, cricketer
 8 March
 Barry Robinson, athlete, architect
 Prince Tui Teka, singer, actor
 10 March – John Creighton, rugby union player
 11 March – John Ward, cricketer
 13 March
 Trevor Blake, cricketer, field hockey player
 Chris Kenny, boxing coach
 31 March – Jindra Tichá, academic, writer

April
 1 April – Dent Harper, cricketer
 2 April – John La Roche, civil engineer, author
 3 April – Eve Rimmer, para athlete
 5 April – Brian Blacktop, lawyer
 7 April – Graeme Davies, metallurgist, university administrator
 8 April – Philip Havill, cricketer
 15 April – Bill Ballantine, marine biologist
 16 April
 David Braithwaite, politician
 Ivan Keats, athlete
 Don Oliver, weightlifter, fitness centre founder
 18 April – Rangi Hetet, master carver
 20 April – Ernest Barnes, field hockey player
 22 April
 Michael Dormer, cricketer
 Bruce Gregory, politician
 Roger Slack, plant biologist and biochemist
 29 April – Tīmoti Kāretu, Māori academic

May
 4 May – Terence Shaw, cricketer
 18 May – Ron Watson, sailor
 20 May – Thomas Goddard, layer, judge

June
 8 June – Michael Crozier, physicist, politician
 20 June
 David Lloyd, botanist
 Phil Skoglund, lawn bowls player
 21 June – John Kent, cartoonist
 23 June – Greer Twiss, sculptor
 24 June – Louise Clough, cricketer

July
 2 July – Judith McKinlay, biblical scholar
 9 July – Bill Kini, boxer, rugby union player
 15 July – Judi Doull, cricketer
 21 July – Barry Thomas, rugby union player
 24 July – Te Wharehuia Milroy, Māori language academic
 25 July – Rose Pere, educationalist, Māori language advocate, conservationist

August
 1 August – Gugi Waaka, musical entertainer
 2 August – Ron Brierley, businessman
 4 August – Charmian O'Connor, physical organic chemist
 7 August – Don McKay, rugby union player
 9 August – Trevor Chinn, glaciologist
 10 August
 Ian Bradley, naval officer, politician
 Valerie Young, athlete
 17 August – Patricia Grace, author
 19 August – Mick Brown, judge
 21 August – Elizabeth Hanan, politician, community leader
 24 August – Philip Newman, cricketer
 26 August – John Veitch, cricketer
 30 August – Bruce McLaren, racing driver and car designer

September
 2 September – Frank Rapley, cricketer
 7 September – Ngātata Love, business academic, Te Āti Awa leader
 10 September – Dave Gallop, cricket player and administrator
 11 September – Marilynn Webb, artist
 14 September
 Stuart Chambers, ornithologist
 John Cullen, field hockey player
 21 September – Dennis Browne, Catholic bishop
 22 September
 Graham Houghton, missionary, educator
 Trevor McKee, Thoroughbred racehorse trainer
 23 September – Alexander Morrison, cricketer
 28 September
 Graeme Caughley, ecologist
 Vincent O'Sullivan, writer

October
 5 October – Brian Maunsell, boxer
 9 October – Richard Walls, businessman, politician
 21 October – Robert Monteith, cricket umpire
 23 October – Lawrie Creamer, milk protein chemist
 27 October – Neville Huxford, cricketer
 28 October – Jim Dawson, cricketer

November
 2 November – Dylan Taite, music journalist
 3 November – Peter Coutts, cricketer
 4 November – Brian Edwards, broadcaster, author
 12 November – Helen Thayer, explorer
 13 November – Abdul Rahim Rasheed, Muslim community leader, lawyer
 19 November
 Meg Campbell, poet
 Kenneth Keith, jurist
 23 November – James Wallace, businessman, arts patron
 25 November – Frances Cherry, writer

December
 1 December – Bill Hume, association footballer
 3 December – Peter Morris, cricketer
 4 December – Ross Dallow, police officer, politician
 5 December – Roger Douglas, politician
 12 December – Grant Tilly, actor
 25 December
 Reese Griffiths, rugby league player
 Ginger Molloy, motorcycle racer
 26 December
 Pam French, fencer
 Gavin Hitchings, jeweller
 29 December
 Ian Lawrence, lawyer, politician
 Ethna Rouse, cricketer

Undated
 Bridget Armstrong, actor
 Mary Cresswell, poet
 Peter Dwyer, zoologist, anthropologist
 Michael Harlow, poet, publisher, editor, librettist
 Ken Maddock, anthropologist
 Toi Te Rito Maihi, artist
 Reihana Parata, master weaver
 Jim Peters, politician
 Pauline Rhodes, artist
 Judy Siers, writer, historian
 Barry Vercoe, computer scientist, composer
 Allan Wallbank, politician
 Judy Wilson, sculptor and fibre artist
 Spiro Zavos, cricketer, journalist, writer

Deaths 
 20 February: Rua Kenana Hepetipa, Māori prophet.
 5 March: Sir Frederic Lang, politician – 8th Speaker of the House of Representatives.
 29 May: Charles Hall, politician.
 19 October: Sir Ernest Rutherford, physicist.
 27 October: Thomas Field, politician.
 16 November: John Lillicrap, 29th Mayor of Invercargill.
 29 November: John Jenkinson, politician.

See also
History of New Zealand
List of years in New Zealand
Military history of New Zealand
Timeline of New Zealand history
Timeline of New Zealand's links with Antarctica
Timeline of the New Zealand environment

References

External links

 
Years of the 20th century in New Zealand